Moli may be 

Moli language (Choiseul)
Moli language (Guadalcanal)